The 1933 St. Louis Cardinals season was the team's 52nd season in St. Louis, Missouri and its 42nd season in the National League. The Cardinals went 82–71 during the season and finished fifth in the National League.

Offseason 
 October 25, 1932: Rogers Hornsby was signed as a free agent by the Cardinals.

Regular season

Season standings

Record vs. opponents

Notable transactions 
 July 26, 1933: Rogers Hornsby was released by the Cardinals.

Roster

Player stats

Batting

Starters by position 
Note: Pos = Position; G = Games played; AB = At bats; H = Hits; Avg. = Batting average; HR = Home runs; RBI = Runs batted in

Other batters 
Note: G = Games played; AB = At bats; H = Hits; Avg. = Batting average; HR = Home runs; RBI = Runs batted in

Pitching

Starting pitchers 
Note: G = Games pitched; IP = Innings pitched; W = Wins; L = Losses; ERA = Earned run average; SO = Strikeouts

Other pitchers 
Note: G = Games pitched; IP = Innings pitched; W = Wins; L = Losses; ERA = Earned run average; SO = Strikeouts

Relief pitchers 
Note: G = Games pitched; W = Wins; L = Losses; SV = Saves; ERA = Earned run average; SO = Strikeouts

Farm system 

LEAGUE CHAMPIONS: Columbus, Greensboro, Beatrice

References

External links
1933 St. Louis Cardinals at Baseball Reference
1933 St. Louis Cardinals team page at www.baseball-almanac.com

St. Louis Cardinals seasons
Saint Louis Cardinals season
St Louis Cardinals